Kirsten Schmidt is a retired West German slalom canoeist who competed in the mid-1960s. She won a bronze medal in the K-1 team event at the 1965 ICF Canoe Slalom World Championships in Spittal.

References

External links 
 Kirsten SCHMIDT at CanoeSlalom.net

West German female canoeists
Possibly living people
Year of birth missing (living people)
Medalists at the ICF Canoe Slalom World Championships